Dead Oak Branch is a stream in Caldwell County in the U.S. state of Missouri.

Dead Oak Branch was named for the dead oak timber along its course.

See also
List of rivers of Missouri

References

Rivers of Caldwell County, Missouri
Rivers of Missouri